Afro-Guyanese are generally descended from the enslaved people brought to Guyana from the coast of West Africa to work on sugar plantations during the era of the Atlantic slave trade. Coming from a wide array of backgrounds and enduring conditions that severely constrained their ability to preserve their respective cultural traditions contributed to the adoption of Christianity and the values of British colonists.

History

Slavery 
The Dutch West India Company turned to the importation of African slaves, who rapidly became a key element in the colonial economy. By the 1660s, the slave population numbered about 2,500; the number of indigenous people was estimated at 50,000, most of whom had retreated into the vast hinterland. Although African slaves were considered an essential element of the colonial economy, their working conditions were brutal. The mortality rate was high, and the dismal conditions led to more than half a dozen slave rebellions.

The most famous slave uprising, the Berbice Slave Uprising, began in February 1763. On two plantations on the Canje River in Berbice, slaves rebelled, taking control of the region. As plantation after plantation fell to the slaves, the European population fled; eventually only half of the whites who had lived in the colony remained. Led by Cuffy (now the national hero of Guyana), the African freedom fighters came to number about 3,000 and threatened European control over the Guianas. The freedom fighters were defeated with the assistance of troops from neighboring French and British colonies and from Europe.

Colonial life was changed radically by the demise of slavery. Although the international slave trade was abolished in the British Empire in 1807, slavery itself continued in the form of "apprentice-ship". In what is known as the Demerara rebellion of 1823 10–13,000 slaves in Demerara-Essequibo rose up against their masters. Although the rebellion was easily crushed, the momentum for abolition remained, and by 1838 total emancipation had been effected. 

The system of apprentice-ship was established to create a buffer period for plantation owners; to keep former slaves as labor but providing payment.

Emancipation 
Even though there was still a demand for plantation labor, the labor conditions were no better post-emancipation, so former slaves were less inclined to work in the plantation system, favoring self-reliance or skilled work. Some ex-slaves moved to towns and villages, feeling that field labor was degrading and inconsistent with freedom, but others pooled their resources to purchase the abandoned estates of their former masters and created village communities. Establishing small settlements provided the new Afro-Guyanese communities an opportunity to grow and sell food, an extension of a practice under which slaves had been allowed to keep the money that came from the sale of any surplus produce. The emergence of an independent-minded Afro-Guyanese peasant class, however, threatened the planters' political power, inasmuch as the planters no longer held a near-monopoly on the colony's economic activity. 

Emancipation also resulted in the introduction of new ethnic and cultural groups into British Guiana, such as Chinese and Portuguese indentured laborers, who upon completing their contracts, became competitors with the new Afro-Guyanese middle class. The largest group of indentured laborers came from India, and would later grow into a thriving and competitive class. Unlike future immigrant groups, former slaves were not granted land or passage to their home country, and this, in addition to other race-based treatment and favoritism, created tension among the ethnic groups.

20th century 
By the early twentieth century, the majority of the urban population of the country was Afro-Guyanese. Many Afro-Guyanese people living in villages had migrated to the towns in search of work. Until the 1930s, Afro-Guyanese people, especially those of mixed descent, comprised the bulk of the non-white professional class. During the 1930s, as Indo-Guyanese began to enter the middle class in large numbers, they began to compete with Afro-Guyanese for professional positions.

Culture 
Slavery had a devastating impact on family and social structure, as individual family member were bought and sold with little regard to kinship or relation. Marriage was not legally recognized for slaves, and even after emancipation, weddings and legal marriages were cost-prohibitive. Household compositions vary, and can be matriarchal or a nuclear family unit.

Although the greatest numbers of Afro-Guyanese are Christian, there are also followers of obeah, a folk religion of African origin, which incorporates beliefs and practices of all the immigrant groups.

Afro-Guyanese make up a significant portion of the public sector workforce. Afro-Guyanese face challenges to private sector involvement, such as access to financing. In politics, Afro-Guyanese make up a  large portion of A Partnership for National Unity party voters. 

In 2017, a United Nations expert group determined that Afro-Guyanese face discrimination in law enforcement, employment, and education.

Notable Afro-Guyanese

See also 

 Afro-Caribbean people
 Guyanese people
 Guyanese in the United Kingdom

References

Works cited 
 

 
Afro-Guyanese
Guyanese
Ethnic groups in Guyana